Maximilian Hofmann is a German broadcast journalist who has been the Head of News & Current Affairs of German broadcaster Deutsche Welle since 2020.

Early life
Hofmann was born in 1974 in Tübingen, West Germany, and grew up in Schwäbisch Hall. His father is German, his mother was 
American, and in his early life he spent summers with his cousins in Indiana.

Education
From 2002 to 2003, Hofmann volunteered at Deutsche Welle (DW), Germany.

From 1998 to 2002, he attended the Free University of Berlin, Germany, and received a [[Master 
of Arts]] in Communication and Journalism, and North American Studies.

From 1996 to 1998, he attended CELSA, Paris-Sorbonne, Île-de-France, and received a Bachelor of Arts in Communication and Journalism.

In 1994, he graduated from Gymnasium bei St. Michael, Schwäbisch Hall, Germany.

Career

Hofmann has been working for Germany's international broadcaster Deutsche Welle (DW) since 2005.

From 1 August 2014 to January 2020, Hofmann was DW's European Correspondent and the Brussels Bureau Chief in charge of the DW Studio in Belgium, reporting on the European Union (EU), NATO, Benelux and France. On 9 May 2018, Hofmann and Tagesthemen moderator Caren Miosga jointly conducted a French-language TV interview with President Emmanuel Macron, his first with a German television channel.

From 2010 to 2014, Hofmann was as a Senior Correspondent for North America at the DW Studio in Washington, D.C., United States.

From 2005 to 2010, he worked as the Personal Editor for the Managing TV Director of DW in Germany, working on various special projects. From 2008 to 2010, he also worked as the Moderator for the DW Clipmania and Deutsche Beats shows.

From 2005 to 2007, he worked as a News Anchor for the Journal, a DW news program in Germany.

From 2003 to 2005, Hofmann worked as a Television and Radio Reporter for Rundfunk Berlin-Brandenburg (rbb) in Germany.

From 2000 to 2002, he worked as an Anchor for Radio Eins, an rbb station, in Germany.

From 1999 to 2000, Hofmann worked as an Anchor for Star FM Radio, a rock station in Germany.

Awards

RIAS Berlin Commission Award
On 30 May 2010, Max Hofmann and Christoph Lanz received the RIAS Berlin Commission New Media Award for their documentary, Eingemauert or Walled In. 
This production, first published as a streaming video on the DW website, is an exploration of the nature 
of the inner German border. This animated reconstruction of the Berlin Wall is an educational work published on the occasion of the 20th anniversary of the Fall of the Berlin Wall.

References

External links
 Max Hofmann profile at DW

1974 births
Living people
German broadcast news analysts
German investigative journalists
German male journalists
German male writers
German nationalists
German opinion journalists
German photojournalists
German radio journalists
German television reporters and correspondents
German television presenters
German television talk show hosts
People from Schwäbisch Hall
People from Tübingen
20th-century German journalists
21st-century German journalists
Photographers from Baden-Württemberg